Manuel Azaña Díaz (10 January 1880 – 3 November 1940) was a Spanish politician who served as Prime Minister of the Second Spanish Republic (1931–1933 and 1936), organizer of the Popular Front in 1935 and the last President of the Republic (1936–1939). He was the most prominent leader of the Republican cause during the Spanish Civil War of 1936–1939.

A published author in the 1910s, he stood out in the pro-Allies camp during World War I.  He was sharply critical towards the Generation of '98, the reimagination of the Spanish Middle Ages, Imperial Spain and the 20th century yearnings for a praetorian refurbishment of the country. Azaña followed instead the examples of the French Enlightenment and the Third French Republic, and took a political quest for democracy in the 1920s while defending the notion of homeland as the "democratic equality of all citizens towards the law" that made him embrace republicanism.

After the Proclamation of the Second Spanish Republic in April 1931, Azaña became Minister of War of the Provisional Government and enacted military reform, looking to develop a modern armed forces with fewer army officers. He later became Prime Minister in October 1931.
 
The Spanish Civil War broke out while he was President. With the defeat of the Republic in 1939, he fled to France, resigned from office, and died in exile only a year later at age 60.

Early career 

Born into a wealthy family, Manuel Azaña Díaz was orphaned at a very young age. He studied in the Universidad Complutense, the Cisneros Institute and the Agustinos of El Escorial. He was awarded a Lawyer's licence by the University of Zaragoza in 1897, and a doctorate by the Universidad Complutense in 1900.

In 1909 he achieved a position at the Main Directorate of the Registries and practised the profession of civil law notary, and travelled to Paris in 1911. He became involved in politics and in 1914 joined the Reformist Republican Party led by Melquíades Álvarez. He collaborated in the production of various newspapers, such as El Imparcial and El Sol. He also joined the Freemasons.

During World War I he covered operations on the Western Front for various newspapers.  His treatment was very sympathetic to the French, and he may have been sponsored by French military intelligence. Afterwards he edited the magazines Pluma and España between 1920 and 1924, founding the former with his brother-in-law Cipriano Rivas Cherif. He was secretary of the Ateneo de Madrid (1913–1920), becoming its president in 1930. He was a candidate for the province of Toledo in 1918 and 1923, but lost on both occasions. In 1926 he founded the Acción Republicana ("Republican Action") party with José Giral. 

A strong critic of the dictatorship of Primo de Rivera, Azaña published a stirring manifesto against the dictator and King Alfonso XIII in 1924. In 1930, he was a signatory of the "Pact of San Sebastián", which united all the republican and regionalist parties in Spain against Primo de Rivera and the King.

On 12 April 1931, republican candidates swept the municipal elections. This was seen as repudiation of Primo de Rivera and the monarchy. Two days later, the Second Spanish Republic was proclaimed and the king forced into exile.

In the government

Niceto Alcalá-Zamora, prime minister of the provisional government of the Republic, named Azaña Minister of War on 14 April. Alcalá-Zamora resigned in October, and Azaña replaced him as prime minister. When the new constitution was adopted on 9 December, Azaña continued as prime minister, leading a coalition of left-wing parties, including his own Acción Republicana and the Socialists (PSOE), while Alcalá-Zamora became President of the Republic.

Azaña pursued some of the major reforms anticipated by the republican program. He introduced work accident insurance, reduced the size of the Spanish Army, and removed some monarchist officers. He also moved to reduce the power and influence of the Roman Catholic Church, abolishing Church-operated schools and charities, and greatly expanding state-operated secular schools.

The Spanish legislature, the Cortes, also enacted an agrarian reform program, under which large private landholdings (latifundia) were to be confiscated and distributed among the rural poor.  However, Azaña was a "middle-class republican", not a socialist. He and his followers were not enthusiastic for this program.  The agrarian law did not include state-funded collective farms, as the Socialists wanted, and was not enacted until late 1932. It was also clumsily written, and threatened many relatively small landholders more than the latifundists. The Azaña government also did very little to carry it out: only 12,000 families received land in the first two years.

In addition, Azaña did little to reform the taxation system to shift the burden of government onto the wealthy. Also, the government continued to support the owners of industry against wildcat strikes or attempted takeovers by militant workers, especially the anarcho-syndicalists of the Confederación Nacional del Trabajo (National Confederation of Labour or CNT). Confrontation with the CNT erupted in bloody violence at Casas Viejas (now Benalup) and Alt-Llobregat. Violence against protesters also occurred against non CNT-affiliated workers during Castilblanco and Arnedo events.

Meanwhile, Azaña's extreme anti-clerical program alienated many moderates. In local elections held in early 1933, most of the seats went to conservative and centrist parties. Elections to the "Tribunal of Constitutional Guarantees" (the Republic's "Supreme Court") followed this pattern.

Thus Azaña came into conflict with both the right and far left. He called a vote of confidence, but two-thirds of the Cortes abstained, and Alcalá-Zamora ordered Azaña's resignation on 8 September 1933. New elections were held on 19 November 1933.

These elections were won by the right-wing Confederación Española de Derechas Autónomas (CEDA) and the centrist Radical Republican Party. Radical leader Alejandro Lerroux became prime minister. Azaña temporarily withdrew from politics and returned to literary activity.

Azaña's self-imposed political retreat lasted only a short while; in 1934 he founded the Republican Left party, the fusion of Acción Republicana with the Radical Socialist Republican Party, led by Marcelino Domingo, and the Organización Republicana Gallega Autónoma (ORGA) of Santiago Casares Quiroga.

On 5 October 1934, the PSOE and Communists attempted a general left-wing rebellion.  The rebellion had a temporary success in Asturias and Barcelona, but was over in two weeks. Azaña was in Barcelona that day, and the Lerroux-CEDA government tried to implicate him. He was arrested and charged with complicity in the rebellion.

In fact Azaña had no connection with the rebellion, and the attempt to convict him on spurious charges soon collapsed, giving him the prestige of a martyr. He was released from prison in January 1935. Azaña then helped organize the Frente Popular ("Popular Front"), a coalition of all the major left-wing parties for the elections of 16 February 1936.

The Front won the election, and Azaña became prime minister again on 19 February. His parliamentary coalition included the PSOE and Communists. This alarmed conservatives, who remembered their attempt to seize power only 17 months earlier. The Azaña government proclaimed an immediate amnesty for all prisoners from the rebellion, which increased conservative concerns. Socialists and Communists were appointed to important positions in the Assault Guard and Civil Guard.

Also, with the Popular Front victory, radicalized peasants led by the Socialists began seizing land on 25 March. Azaña chose to legitimize these actions rather than challenge them. Radical Socialists vied with Communists in calling for violent revolution and forcible suppression of the Right. Political assassinations by Communists, Socialists, and anarchosyndicalists were frequent, as were retaliations by increasingly radicalized conservatives.

Azaña insisted that the danger to the Republic was from the Right and on 11 March, the government suppressed the Falange.

Azaña was a man of very strong convictions. Stanley G. Payne tentatively described him as "the last great figure of traditional Castilian arrogance in the history of Spain." As a "middle class republican", he was implacably hostile to the monarchy and the Church. The CEDA, which was pro-Catholic, he therefore regarded as illegitimate, and also any and all monarchists, even those who supported parliamentary democracy.

In the view of Paul Preston, nothing indicates more directly the value of the services provided by Azaña to the Republic than the hatred felt towards him by the ideologues and propagandists of the Francoist cause.

Presidency

When the Cortes met in April, it removed President Alcalá-Zamora from office. On 7 April 1936, Azaña was elected President of the Republic; Quiroga succeeded him as prime minister. Azaña by this time was profoundly depressed by the increasing disorder, but could see no way to counter it.

Azaña repeatedly warned his fellow Republicans that the lack of unity within the government was a serious threat to the Republic's stability. Political violence continued: there were over 200 assassinations in February through early July.

By July, the military conspiracy to overthrow the Republic was well underway, but nothing definite had been planned. Then
on 13 July, José Calvo Sotelo, leader of a small monarchist grouping in the Cortes, was arrested and murdered by a mixed group of Socialist gunmen and Assault Guards. Azaña and Quiroga did not act effectively against the killers.

On 17 July, right-wing, Falangist, and Monarchist elements in the Republican army proclaimed the overthrow of the Republic. The rebellion failed in Madrid, however. Azaña replaced Quiroga as Prime Minister with his ally Diego Martínez Barrio, and the government attempted a compromise with the rebels, which was rejected by General Mola.

On 13 September, Azaña authorized Minister of Finance Juan Negrín to move the nation's gold reserve to wherever Negrin thought it would be secure. Negrin shipped it to the Soviet Union, which claimed it in payment for arms supplied to the Republic.

In 1938, Azaña moved to Barcelona with the rest of the Republican government, and was cut off there when the Monarchist forces drove to the sea between Barcelona and Valencia.

When Barcelona fell to the rebels on 26 January 1939, Azaña fled to France. He passed through the Pyrenees on foot on 5 February 1939.

On 3 March, he resigned as President of the Republic, rather than return to Madrid with the rest of the government. Both Nationalist and Republican commentators have condemned this decision as "desertion".

Last days

Azaña lived in exile in France for more than a year after the war, trapped by the invasion of France by Germany and institution of the Vichy regime. He died on 3 November 1940, in Montauban, France.  

He received the last rites of Catholicism before his death. The Vichy French authorities refused to allow his coffin to be covered with the Spanish Republican flag. The coffin was covered instead with the flag of Mexico, whose government had vested him with Mexican citizenship and named him Honorary Ambassador to grant him diplomatic immunity. His residence was officially an extension of the Mexican Embassy and therefore under Mexican jurisdiction. Several attempts were made to arrest him to take him back to Madrid, all of which failed thanks to his immunity and the presence of elite Mexican military personnel.

Writings
In his diaries and memoirs, on which he worked meticulously, Azaña vividly describes the various personality and ideological conflicts between himself and various Republican leaders, such as Largo Caballero and Negrín. Azaña's writings during the Civil War have been resources for study by scholars of the workings of the Republican government during the conflict. Along with his extensive memoirs and diaries, Azaña also wrote a number of well-known speeches. His speech on 18 July 1938 is one of the best known in which he implores his fellow Spaniards to seek reconciliation after the fighting ends and emphasizes the need for "Peace, Pity, and Pardon."

Azaña wrote a play during the Civil War, La velada en Benicarló ("Vigil in Benicarló"). Having worked on the play during the previous weeks, Azaña dictated the final version while he was trapped in Barcelona during the "Days of May" violence. In the play, Azaña uses various characters to espouse the various ideological, political and social perspectives present within the Republic during the war. He portrayed and explored the rivalries and conflicts that were damaging the political cohesion of the Republic.

Azaña was aware of General Franco and Sanjurjo's firm determination to overthrow the Republic, which would culminate in the Law of Political Responsibilities (Ley de Responsabilidades Políticas) at the end of the war. Saddened, he reflected:

During the many years of his political activity, Azaña kept diaries. His work Diarios completos: monarquía, república, Guerra Civil was published posthumously in Spanish in 2003.

Political legacy
According to British historian Piers Brendon, Manuel Azaña was the leading Republican politician. He was a well-educated would-be writer who "plotted to rid Spain of the yoke of church and king". A brilliant speaker, Azaña was graceful in word, but clumsy in action.  "He was a polemical bullfighter but a political bulldozer.". Although he preached a lofty form of liberalism, he had a mixed record as prime minister. He wanted to introduce a welfare state with minimum-wage, sickness benefits and paid holidays, but he never attempted to deal with the overwhelming problem of peasant poverty. He was so concerned to balance the budget that he cut back on land redistribution. He worked more effectively to establish a secular state, breaking the Catholic church’s hold on education, legalizing civil marriage, seizing Catholic properties, expelling the Jesuit order, and tolerating the burning of church buildings such as convents for nuns. "All the convents in Spain are not worth a single Republican life," he proclaimed. As opposition mounted, he censored the press, exiled his enemies to North Africa, and formed a private militia force of Assault Guards. Meanwhile, his allies the anarchists were assassinating priests and nuns, and burning convents. Azaña tried to reform the army, by replacing outmoded equipment and closing its military academy. In the process he demoted its most promising general—young Francisco Franco. Azaña was defeated in the elections of November 1933, having antagonized extremists and alienated the moderates. He made a comeback in 1936 but could not hold his coalition together in the face of a civil war. In recent decades he has become a hero of the left in Spain.

See also
 History of Spain
 Second Spanish Republic
 Spanish Civil War

References

Further reading 
 
 Ben-Ami, Shlomo. The origins of the Second Republic in Spain (Oxford UP, 1978).
 
 Feeny, Thomas. "Fact and Fiction in Rojas 'Azaña'." Hispanófila 103 (1991): 33–46. online; on a fictionalized  life of Azaña.
 
 Sedwick, Frank. The tragedy of Manuel Azaña and the fate of the Spanish Republic (Ohio State Univ Press, 1964) online review.

Other languages
 Lagarrigue, Max. "Manuel Azaña en Montauban.

External links
 
  Manuel Azaña Association

1880 births
1940 deaths
People from Alcalá de Henares
Reformist Party (Spain) politicians
Republican Action (Spain) politicians
Republican Left (Spain) politicians
Presidents of Spain
Prime Ministers of Spain
Leaders ousted by a coup
Members of the Congress of Deputies of the Second Spanish Republic
Spanish male dramatists and playwrights
Spanish people of the Spanish Civil War (Republican faction)
Spanish notaries
Spanish agnostics
Exiles of the Spanish Civil War in France
Leaders of political parties in Spain
Complutense University of Madrid alumni
20th-century Spanish dramatists and playwrights
University of Zaragoza alumni
Spanish political writers
20th-century Spanish male writers
Exiled Spanish politicians
Government ministers during the Second Spanish Republic
Spanish Anti-Francoists